County Down is one of the six counties of Northern Ireland, one of the nine counties of Ulster and one of the traditional thirty-two counties of Ireland. It borders County Antrim to the north, the Irish Sea to the east, County Armagh to the west, and County Louth across Carlingford Lough to the southwest.

In the east of the county is Strangford Lough and the Ards Peninsula. The largest town is Bangor, on the northeast coast. Three other large towns and cities are on its border: Newry lies on the western border with County Armagh, while Lisburn and Belfast lie on the northern border with County Antrim. Down contains both the southernmost point of Northern Ireland (Cranfield Point) and the easternmost point of Ireland (Burr Point).

It was one of two counties of Northern Ireland to have a Protestant majority at the 2001 census. The other Protestant majority County is County Antrim to the north. In the 2021 census, Ards and North Down had the highest number of "No Religion" responses (30.6%) for Northern Ireland.

In March 2018, The Sunday Times published its list of Best Places to Live in Britain, including five in Northern Ireland. The list included three in County Down: Holywood, Newcastle, and Strangford.

Toponymy
County Down takes its name from dún, the Irish word for dun or fort, which is a common root in Gaelic place names (such as Dundee, Dunfermline and Dumbarton in Scotland and Donegal and Dundalk in Ireland). The fort in question was in the historic town of Downpatrick, originally known as Dún Lethglaise ("fort of the green side" or "fort of the two broken fetters").

History

During the 2nd century the region was home to the Voluntii tribe, according to Ptolemy. From the 400s-1177 County Down formed a central part of the kingdom of Ulaid. Ulaid was a frequent target of Viking raids in the eighth and ninth centuries, however fierce local resistance prevented the Norse from setting up permanent settlements in the region. In 1001 a fleet led by Sigtrygg Silkbeard raided much of the region in retribution for the Ulaiden's refusal to offer him sanctuary from Brian Boru the previous year.

The region was invaded by the Normans in 1177. From the 1180s-1600s the region saw waves of English and Scottish immigration. In 1569 the Irish Parliament passed "An Act for turning of Countries that be not yet Shire Grounds into Shire Grounds". In 1570 a commission was issued in pursance of that statute "to survey and make enquiry in the countries and territories ... that are not shire ground, or are doubtful to what shire they belong; to limit and nominate them a shire or county; to divide them into countries, baronies or hundreds, or to join them to any existing shire or barony" "for the countries or territories of Arde, as well this side Blackstafe as the other side, Copelande islands, the Dufferin, Clandeboy, Kilultoghe, the Glynes with the Raughlines, Momerie and Carie, the Rowte M'William (McQuillan) and all lands between lough Coine and lough Eaghe, and the water of Strangforde and the Banne. To certify their proceedings before the 1st August." The county was privately planted during the Plantation period (16th-17th centuries). During the Williamite War in Ireland (1689–1691) the county was a centre of Protestant rebellion against the rule of the Catholic James II. After forming a scratch force the Protestants were defeated by the Irish Army at the Break of Dromore and forced to retreat, leading to the whole of Down falling under Jacobite control. Later the same year Marshal Schomberg's large Williamite expedition arrived in Belfast Lough and captured Bangor. After laying siege to Carrickfergus, Schomberg marched south to Dundalk Camp, clearing County Down and much of the rest of East Ulster of Jacobite troops.

Geography

Down contains two significant peninsulas: Ards Peninsula and Lecale peninsula.

The county has a coastline along Belfast Lough to the north and Carlingford Lough to the south (both of which have access to the sea). Strangford Lough lies between the Ards Peninsula and the mainland. Down also contains part of the shore of Lough Neagh. Smaller loughs include Lough Island Reavy and Castlewellan Lake near Castlewellan, Clea Lough near Killyleagh, Lough Money and Loughinisland near Downpatrick and, within the Mourne Mountains, Silent Valley Reservoir, Ben Crom Reservoir, Spelga Dam and Lough Shannagh.

The River Lagan forms most of the border with County Antrim. The River Bann also flows through the southwestern areas of the county. Other rivers include the Clanrye and Quoile.

There are several islands off the Down coast: Mew Island, Light House Island and the Copeland Islands, all of which lie to the north of the Ards Peninsula. Gunn Island lies off the Lecale coast. In addition, there are at least seventy islands (several inhabited) along with many islets - or pladdies - in Strangford Lough, although folk tradition says there are 365 islands in Strangford Lough, one for every day of the year.

County Down is where, in the words of the song by Percy French, "The mountains of Mourne sweep down to the sea", and the area around the granite Mourne Mountains continues to be known for its scenery.

Places of interest

 Saint Patrick is reputed to be buried at Down Cathedral in Downpatrick, reputedly alongside St. Brigid and St. Columcille.
 Saul, County Down (from the Irish: Sabhall meaning "Barn") – where Saint Patrick said his first eucharist in Ireland
 The city of Newry in the south of the county contains St Patrick's (Church of Ireland, 1578), overlooking the city centre from Church street, on the east side of the city, which is considered to be Ireland's first ever Protestant church. The Newry Canal is also the first summit-level canal ever to be built in the British Isles.
 Castlewellan Forest Park.
Cloughmore (The Big Stone), a 30-ton Granite boulder lies on the Slieve Martin Mountain Ridge approximately 1000 ft. above Rostrevor village in Kilbroney Park.
 Down is also home to Exploris, the Northern Ireland Aquarium, located in Portaferry, on the shores of Strangford Lough, on the Ards Peninsula.
 The Old Inn in Crawfordsburn is one of Ireland's oldest hostelries, with records dating back to 1614. It is predated however by Donaghadee's Grace Neill's which was opened in 1611. The Old inn claims that people who have stayed there include Jonathan Swift, Dick Turpin, Peter the Great, Lord Tennyson, Charles Dickens, Anthony Trollope, former US president George H. W. Bush, and C. S. Lewis, who honeymooned there.
 Tollymore Forest Park between Castlewellan and Newcastle.
 Scrabo Tower, in Newtownards, was built as a memorial to Charles Stewart, 3rd Marquess of Londonderry.
 An area of County Down is known as the Brontë Homeland (situated between Rathfriland and Banbridge, where Patrick Brontë had his church.) Patrick Brontë (originally Brunty), father of Anne, Charlotte, Emily and Branwell, was born in this region.

Subdivisions
Baronies

 Ards Lower (from the )
 Ards Upper
 Castlereagh Lower
 Castlereagh Upper
 Dufferin (from the )
 Iveagh Lower, Lower Half (from the )
 Iveagh Lower, Upper Half
 Iveagh Upper, Lower Half
 Iveagh Upper, Upper Half
 Kinelarty (from the )
 Lecale Lower (from the )
 Lecale Upper
 Lordship of Newry
 Mourne (from the )

Parishes

Townlands

Settlements

Cities
(population of 75,000 or more at 2001 Census)
 Belfast – the eastern suburbs of the city lie partly in County Down but mainly in County Antrim
 Lisburn – the eastern suburbs of the city lie partly in County Down but mainly in County Antrim
 Newry – in counties Armagh and Down, divided by the Clanrye River

Large towns
(population of 18,000 or more and under 75,000 at 2001 Census)

Medium towns
(Population of 10,000 or more and under 18,000 at 2001 Census)

Small towns
(Population of 4,500 or more and under 10,000 at 2001 Census)

Intermediate settlements
(Population of 2,250 or more and under 4,500 at 2001 Census)

Villages
(Population of 1,000 or more and under 2,250 at 2001 Census)

Small villages or hamlets
(Population of less than 1,000 at 2001 Census)

Administration
The county was administered by Down County Council from 1899 until the abolition of county councils in Northern Ireland in 1973. County Down is now served by the following local government districts:
 Ards and North Down
 Newry, Mourne and Down (also serves part of County Armagh)
 Lisburn and Castlereagh (also serves part of County Antrim)
 Belfast (also serves part of County Antrim)
 Armagh City, Banbridge and Craigavon (also serves parts of County Armagh and County Antrim)

Transportation

Railways

Former railways within the county include the Great Northern Railway of Ireland and Belfast and County Down Railway both of which were formed in the 19th century and were closed (or amalgamated) in the 1950s. The Downpatrick and County Down Railway operates a short section of the former Belfast and County Down line as a heritage railway between Downpatrick and Inch Abbey.

Northern Ireland Railways operates the area's modern rail network.

Sport

Association football
In association football, the NIFL Premiership, which operates as the top division, has three teams in the county: Newry City F. C., Ards F.C. and Warrenpoint Town F.C., with Banbridge Town F.C., Bangor F.C. and Lisburn Distillery F.C. competing in the NIFL Championship, which operates as levels two and three.

Gaelic games
The Down County Board administers Gaelic games in the county. Down is the most successful team north of the border in terms of All-Ireland Senior Football Championships won with five (1960, 1961, 1968, 1991 and 1994) in total. In terms of Ulster, they share that accolade with Cavan who also have 5 titles. They currently have four minor All-Ireland titles, twelve Ulster titles and one under 21 all Ireland title (1979). The Ards peninsula is a hurling stronghold.

Golf
County Down is also home to the No.1-ranked golf course, Royal County Down Golf Club, in not just Ireland, but the entire Great Britain, according to Today's Golfer.

Former No.1 golfer in the world, Rory McIlroy, originates from Holywood, which is situated in the north of the county.

In popular culture
"Star of the County Down" is a popular Irish ballad.

The county is named in the lyrics of the song "Around the World", from the film Around the World in 80 Days, which was an American top ten hit for Bing Crosby and UK top ten hit for Ronnie Hilton, both in 1957, although it was Mantovani's instrumental version which was actually used in the film. Rihanna's video "We Found Love" was filmed there in 2011, causing complaints when the singer removed her clothes to reveal a bikini.

The Ulster singer Van Morrison has made reference to the County Down in the lyrics to several songs including "Northern Muse (Solid Ground)", "Mystic of the East" and the nostalgic "Coney Island", which names several places and landmarks in the county.  Van Morrison also covered "Star of the County Down" with The Chieftains as a part of their collaboration album Irish Heartbeat.

C.S. Lewis, author of The Chronicles of Narnia, was inspired by the Mourne Mountains. There is a Narnia trail in Kilbroney Park, in Rostrevor.

Sam Hanna Bell based his novel of Ulster rural life, December Bride (1951) in the Ards peninsula. A film version of the novel, also called December Bride, was produced in 1990 and released in November 1991.

Several areas of County Down served as filming locations for the HBO series Game of Thrones including Castle Ward (Winterfell), Inch Abby (Riverlands), and Tollymore Forest Park.

The Academy award winning short film The Shore (2011) was filmed in and around Killough bay by director/writer Terry George and his daughter Oorlagh. The film starred Ciaran Hynds, Kerry Condon and Connleth Hill.

Notable people

 Ash, rock band, from Downpatrick
 Paddy Ashdown, former Liberal Democrats (UK) leader, brought up near Comber
 Joseph Barcroft, scientist, Newry
 Colin Blakely, actor, Bangor
 Christine Bleakley, TV Presenter was born in Newry and lived in Newtownards
 Patrick Brontë, father of the authors Charlotte, Emily, and Anne Brontë, Rathfriland
 Comgall, saint and founder of the great monastery at Bangor
 Stephen Craigan, Motherwell and Northern Ireland defender, from Newtownards
 Jamie Dornan, actor in 50 Shades of Grey is from Holywood
 Garth Ennis, comic books author of Preacher and The Boys, brought up in Holywood
 Harry Ferguson, inventor of modern tractor, Dromore
 Brian Faulkner, Baron Faulkner of Downpatrick, last Prime Minister of Northern Ireland, Helen's Bay
 Patricia Ford, first female MP from Northern Ireland, Donaghadee
 Charlie Gallogly, Irish professional footballer for Huddersfield Town, Watford and Bournemouth.
 Keith Gillespie, former Manchester United & Newcastle professional footballer grew up in Bangor 
 Craig Gilroy, Ulster Rugby winger, raised in Bangor
 Betsy Gray, heroine of the 1798 rebellion, Gransha, Bangor
 Bear Grylls, Chief Scout and TV personality, was raised in Donaghadee
 Frederick Hamilton-Temple-Blackwood, 1st Marquess of Dufferin and Ava, Governor-General of Canada, Viceroy of India, Clandeboye Estate
 Henry Harrison, Parnellite Member of Parliament, Holywood
 Sarah Cecilia Harrison, artist and first woman councillor to serve on Dublin Corporation, Holywood
 David Healy, Northern Ireland record goalscorer from Killyleagh
 Eddie Irvine, racing driver, Newtownards
 E. Neville Isdell, former chair and CEO of The Coca-Cola Company, Downpatrick
 Pat Jennings, former NI goalkeeper, is from Newry
 Patrick Kielty, comedian and television presenter, Dundrum
 Gary Lightbody, lead singer of Snow Patrol, Bangor
Kathleen Isabella Mackie (1899– 1996) painter and glider pilot
Elizabeth McLaughlin (sculptor)
 Josh Magennis, Professional footballer currently for Bolton Wanderers F.C. from Bangor
 James Martin, inventor of the ejector seat, from Crossgar
 Robert Blair Mayne, lieutenant colonel and commanding officer of the 1st SAS Regiment, Newtownards
 Aodh MacCathmhaoil, Roman Catholic Archbishop of Armagh and Primate of all Ireland, Saul, County Down 
 Rhys McClenaghan - International gymnast from Newtownards
 Edward McGarry, Wisconsin politician
 Rory McIlroy, major champion golfer, from Holywood
 Deirdre McKay, composer
 F.E. McWilliam, sculptor, Banbridge
 Colin Middleton, Irish artist and surrealist, lived in Bangor
 John Mitchel, Irish nationalist, Young Ireland movement, Newry 
 Colin Murray, sports TV Presenter, is from Dundonald
 Richard Murray, Provost of Trinity College Dublin 1795–1799, born in County Down
 Kristian Nairn, portrayed Hodor in Game of Thrones is from Lisburn
 Lembit Öpik, former Liberal Democrat MP and Shadow Welsh and Shadow Northern Ireland Secretary, Bangor
 Paul Rankin, TV chef, grew up in Ballywalter, Ards Peninsula
 Francis Rawdon-Hastings, Governor-General of India, 1813 - 1823, Moira 
 Margaret Ritchie, Baroness Ritchie of Downpatrick, former leader of Social Democratic and Labour Party and MP, Downpatrick
 Charles Russell, Baron Russell of Killowen, first Roman Catholic Lord Chief Justice of England and Wales, Newry
 Zöe Salmon, TV presenter and Miss UK contestant is from Bangor
 Neil Shawcross, artist, lives in Hillsborough 
 Hans Sloane, founder of the British Museum, Killyleagh 
 Robert Stewart, Viscount Castlereagh, British Foreign Secretary and diplomat at Congress of Vienna, brought up in family seat Mount Stewart
 David Trimble, Baron Trimble, former First Minister of Northern Ireland, former Ulster Unionist Party leader, Bangor 
 Foy Vance, singer-songwriter, Bangor
 Charles Vane-Tempest-Stewart, 7th Marquess of Londonderry, Secretary of State for Air, Leader of the House of Lords, Mount Stewart 
 Martin Waddell, author of children's books, lives in Newcastle, County Down
 Paddy Wallace, rugby union footballer for Ulster and Ireland, Dundonald
 Thomas L. Young, U.S. politician, 33rd Governor of the State of Ohio, Killyleagh

See also
 Abbeys and priories in Northern Ireland (County Down)
 List of places in County Down
 Lord Lieutenant of Down
 High Sheriff of Down

Notes

References

Further reading
 Harris, Walter (attributed). 1744. The Ancient and Present Stare of the County of Down...'''Dublin.
 The Memoirs of John M. Regan, a Catholic Officer in the RIC and RUC, 1909–48'', Joost Augusteijn, editor, District Inspector, Co. Down 1930s, 1919, .

External links

 
County Down on the interactive map of the counties of Great Britain and Ireland – Wikishire
 Culture Northern Ireland – Industrial Heritage of County Down
 

 
Counties of Northern Ireland
Down